The  dominates the city of Shimonoseki and is the tallest tower in western Japan. Standing 153 metres tall, it was opened in July 1996. It forms a part of the Kaikyō Messe Shimonoseki building, which houses a conference centre and corporate offices.

The tower was designed by NTT Power and Building Facilities and built by Takenaka Corporation. 

Upon paying an admission fee, tourists can visit an observation deck in the glass sphere at the top of the building for panoramic views over the city and the Kanmon Straits.

The address of the tower is 3-3-1 Buzenda-cho, Shimonoseki, Yamaguchi, 750-0018

See also
Buzenda (the most famous downtown in Yamaguchi Prefecture)
Shimonoseki Station
Shimonoseki

References

External links 
山口県国際総合センター (Yamaguchi Kokusai Sōgo Center), Japanese Wikipedia

Towers in Japan
Buildings and structures in Yamaguchi Prefecture
Tourist attractions in Yamaguchi Prefecture
Towers completed in 1996
Shimonoseki
1996 establishments in Japan